Mathew Guberina is an Australian former professional rugby league footballer who played in the 1990s. He played for Manly-Warringah in the ARL competition.

Playing career
Before joining Manly, Guberina played for the Warringah Rugby Club. 

In round 7 of the 1995 ARL season, he made his first grade debut against North Queensland at the Willows Sports Complex. Guberina played a total of three years at Manly with each season seeing the club winning the Minor Premiership and claiming the 1996 premiership defeating St. George in the grand final.

References

1971 births
Manly Warringah Sea Eagles players
Australian rugby league players
Rugby league props
Living people